V.N. Vasavan (Born in 1954) is an Indian politician and the current Minister for Cooperation and Registration, Government of Kerala in the second Pinarayi Vijayan Ministry. Now he is also the MLA from Ettumanoor assembly constituency of the Communist Party of India (Marxist) for Kottayam district. Vasavan is the member of the Kerala Legislature for the constituency of Ettumanoor.

Political career
Vasavan entered politics through student federation. Then he was district joint secretary of KSYF and DYFI. He became a member of the Communist Party of India (Marxist) in 1974, elected as a District Committee Member in 1991, as District Secretariat Member in 1997 and as Kottayam District Secretary in the district conference held at Ettumanoor on 18 January 2018. Vasavan is one of the State Committee members of CPIM Kerala.

He was a member of Pampady Grampanchayath, President Pampady Housing Cooperative Society, President of Kottayam District Cooperative Bank, Director of State Cooperative Bank, General Secretary Kerala Private Hospital Employees Federation, Syndicate Member Sree Shankaracharya University of Sanskrit, Kalady and District President of CITU, Kottayam.

Vasavan contested the Kerala Legislature elections from Puthuppally in 1987 and 1991 and from Kottayam in 2006 and 2011. He was MLA for Kottayam between 2006 and 2011. Now Vasavan is the District Secretary of CPI(M), Kottayam District, State Committee Member of CPI(M),  Director Board Member of RUBCO, General Council and Working Committee member of CITU,  President of the Navalokam Cultural Center, General Secretary Pampady Range Toddy Workers Union and President Captain Lakshmy Charitable Society. Vasavan is the Advisory Board Chairman of ABHAYAM CHARITABLE SOCIETY Kottayam.

References

External links
 http://www.niyamasabha.org/codes/members/vasavanvn.pdf
 https://www.youtube.com/watch?v=hNQOeOoKQa4
 http://www.thehindu.com/todays-paper/tp-national/tp-kerala/vn-vasavan-to-head-cpim-in-kottayam/article6800839.ece
 http://www.newindianexpress.com/states/kerala/V-N-Vasavan-Elected-CPM-Kottayam-Dist-Secretary/2015/01/19/article2625724.ece

1954 births
Living people
Communist Party of India (Marxist) politicians from Kerala
People from Kottayam district